Airtight Games was an American independent video game developer based in Redmond founded in 2004 that was made up of former members of FASA Studio, Will Vinton Studios and Microsoft, as well as several other studios. The key members included president and creative director Jim Deal, art director Matt Brunner, and co-founder Ed Fries. Their first title was the 2010 action game Dark Void, published by Capcom and released for Microsoft Windows, PlayStation 3 and Xbox 360 platforms.

In 2012 they released a puzzle-platform game with Square Enix as publisher, titled Quantum Conundrum. They followed this up with two mobile games for iOS in 2012 and 2013, and Soul Fjord, a hybrid roguelike/rhythm game developed as an exclusive title for the short-lived Ouya console and released in 2014.

In June 2014 they released the adventure-mystery game Murdered: Soul Suspect, published by Square Enix and released for Microsoft Windows, PlayStation 3, PlayStation 4, Xbox 360 and Xbox One. Earlier that year the studio had laid off 14 employees, and its creative director Kim Swift joining Amazon Game Studios.

Murdered: Soul Suspect received an average reception upon release. A month later Airtight Games closed in July 2014.

Company overview
Airtight Games was formed in 2004 by a group of industry veterans and the core team that shipped the Xbox title Crimson Skies: High Road to Revenge. Airtight Games has been working with publishers and industry leaders on contracts and publishing deals. With backgrounds in the game, film, television and comic book industries, Airtight Games' team claims ship credit on over fifty different titles and decades of combined industry experience.

Games developed

References

External links

Defunct companies based in Redmond, Washington
American companies established in 2004
Video game companies established in 2004
American companies disestablished in 2014
Video game companies disestablished in 2014
Defunct companies based in Washington (state)
Defunct video game companies of the United States
Video game development companies
2004 establishments in Washington (state)
2014 disestablishments in Washington (state)